Hermine Rheinberger (July 14, 1864 – January 24, 1932) was a Liechtensteiner writer. With the publication of her 1897 historical novel Gutenberg-Schalun, she became Liechtenstein's first female author.

Biography 
Hermine Rheinberger was born in 1864 in Vaduz, the capital city of Liechtenstein. She was one of four children born to Peter and Theresi Rheinberger, growing up with two sisters and a brother, the artist and architect . Her uncle was the composer Josef Rheinberger.

After attending elementary school in Vaduz, Rheinberger studied at the Institut Gutenberg in Balzers, run by the Sisters of Christian Charity, from 1877 to 1881. She became interested in literature and history at a young age, and she was supported in her literary pursuits by her brother and by her cousin Ferdinand Nigg. In the late 1870s, she began to write poetry celebrating nature and her homeland of Liechtenstein.

In 1890 and 1891 she wrote the historical novel Gutenberg-Schalun: Eine Geschichte aus dem 14. Jahrhundert ("Gutenberg-Schalun: A Story From the 14th Century"), studying local history, folklore, and the Middle High German language as part of her research for the book. It was published in 1897, making her the first woman to publish a work of literature in Liechtenstein. The novel was well received, even drawing notice from Prince Johann II.

Rheinberger never married, focusing on her literary pursuits, until her career was cut short by illness. From 1899 until her death in 1932, Rheinberger stayed at the St.-Josephs-Institut in Mils, Tyrol.

References 

1864 births
1932 deaths
Liechtenstein writers
Liechtenstein women writers
19th-century women writers
People from Vaduz
German-language poets
German-language writers